Dean R. Mealy (May 7, 1915 – April 28, 1973) was an American professional basketball player. He played for the Akron Goodyear Wingfoots and Oshkosh All-Stars in the National Basketball League (NBL) between 1937 and 1940. For his career he averaged 3.8 points per game and helped lead the Wingfoots to the NBL championship in 1937–38. 

While at Muskingum University, Mealy played for the football, basketball, and track teams.

References

1915 births
1973 deaths
Akron Goodyear Wingfoots players
American men's basketball players
Basketball players from Ohio
Centers (basketball)
Muskingum Fighting Muskies football players
Muskingum Fighting Muskies men's basketball players
Oshkosh All-Stars players
People from Cuyahoga Falls, Ohio